This is an incomplete list of Statutory Rules of Northern Ireland in 2001.

1-100

 Specified Risk Material (Amendment) Order (Northern Ireland) 2001 (S.R. 2001 No. 1)
 General Dental Services (Amendment) Regulations (Northern Ireland) 2001 (S.R. 2001 No. 2)
 Road Traffic (Fixed Penalty) Order (Northern Ireland) 2001 (S.R. 2001 No. 3)
 Social Security (Capital Disregards Amendment) Regulations (Northern Ireland) 2001 (S.R. 2001 No. 4)
 Organic Farming Regulations (Northern Ireland) 2001 (S.R. 2001 No. 5)
 Equality Commission (Time Limits) Regulations (Northern Ireland) 2001 (S.R. 2001 No. 6)
 Equality Commission (Time Limits) Regulations (Northern Ireland) 2001 (S.R. 2001 No. 9)
 Child Support (Temporary Compensation Payment Scheme) Regulations (Northern Ireland) 2001 (S.R. 2001 No. 12)
 Stakeholder Pension Schemes (Amendment) Regulations (Northern Ireland) 2001 (S.R. 2001 No. 13)
 Child Support (Collection and Enforcement and Miscellaneous Amendments) Regulations (Northern Ireland) 2001 (S.R. 2001 No. 15)
 Child Support (Information, Evidence and Disclosure and Maintenance Arrangements and Jurisdiction) (Amendment) Regulations (Northern Ireland) 2001 (S.R. 2001 No. 16)
 Child Support (Maintenance Calculation Procedure) Regulations (Northern Ireland) 2001 (S.R. 2001 No. 17)
 Child Support (Maintenance Calculations and Special Cases) Regulations (Northern Ireland) 2001 (S.R. 2001 No. 18)
 Child Support (Transitional Provisions) Regulations (Northern Ireland) 2001 (S.R. 2001 No. 19)
 Child Support (Variations) Regulations (Northern Ireland) 2001 (S.R. 2001 No. 20)
 Child Support (Voluntary Payments) Regulations (Northern Ireland) 2001 (S.R. 2001 No. 21)
 Social Security (Claims and Payments) (Amendment) Regulations (Northern Ireland) 2001 (S.R. 2001 No. 22)
 Social Security and Child Support (Decisions and Appeals) (Amendment) Regulations (Northern Ireland) 2001 (S.R. 2001 No. 23)
 Child Support (Variations) (Modification of Statutory Provisions) Regulations (Northern Ireland) 2001 (S.R. 2001 No. 24)
 Social Security (Child Maintenance Premium and Miscellaneous Amendments) Regulations (Northern Ireland) 2001 (S.R. 2001 No. 25)
 Dairy Produce Quotas (Amendment) Regulations (Northern Ireland) 2001 (S.R. 2001 No. 27)
 Motor Vehicles (Construction and Use) (Amendment) Regulations (Northern Ireland) 2001 (S.R. 2001 No. 28)
 Child Support (Consequential Amendments and Transitional Provisions) Regulations (Northern Ireland) 2001 (S.R. 2001 No. 29)
 Potatoes Originating in Egypt (Amendment) Regulations (Northern Ireland) 2001 (S.R. 2001 No. 32)
 Child Support, Pensions and Social Security (2000 Act) (Commencement No. 4) Order (Northern Ireland) 2001 (S.R. 2001 No. 34)
 Northern Ireland Policing Board (Prescribed Period) Regulations 2001 (S.R. 2001 No. 35)
 Statutory Maternity Pay (General) and Statutory Sick Pay (General) (Amendment) Regulations (Northern Ireland) 2001 (S.R. 2001 No. 36)
 Industrial Tribunals (1996 Order) (Application of Conciliation Provisions) Order (Northern Ireland) 2001 (S.R. 2001 No. 37)
 Recognition and Derecognition Ballots (Qualified Persons) Order (Northern Ireland) 2001 (S.R. 2001 No. 38)
 Trade Union Recognition (Method of Collective Bargaining) Order (Northern Ireland) 2001 (S.R. 2001 No. 39)
 Waste and Contaminated Land (1997 Order) (Commencement No. 5) Order (Northern Ireland) 2001 (S.R. 2001 No. 40)
 Social Security Benefits Up-rating Order (Northern Ireland) 2001 (S.R. 2001 No. 41)
 Guaranteed Minimum Pensions Increase Order (Northern Ireland) 2001 (S.R. 2001 No. 42)
 Countryside Management Regulations (Northern Ireland) 2001 (S.R. 2001 No. 43)
 Coffee Extracts and Chicory Extracts Regulations (Northern Ireland) 2001 (S.R. 2001 No. 45)
 Miscellaneous Food Additives (Amendment) Regulations (Northern Ireland) 2001 (S.R. 2001 No. 46)
 Feeding Stuffs Regulations (Northern Ireland) 2001 (S.R. 2001 No. 47)
 Specified Risk Material (Amendment) Regulations (Northern Ireland) 2001 (S.R. 2001 No. 48)
 Additional Pension (First Appointed Year) Order (Northern Ireland) 2001 (S.R. 2001 No. 49)
 Social Fund (Recovery by Deductions from Benefits) (Amendment) Regulations (Northern Ireland) 2001 (S.R. 2001 No. 52)
 Employment Rights (Increase of Limits) Order (Northern Ireland) 2001 (S.R. 2001 No. 54)
 Rates (Regional Rates) Order (Northern Ireland) 2001 (S.R. 2001 No. 55)
 Jobseeker's Allowance (Joint Claims: Consequential Amendments) Regulations (Northern Ireland) 2001 (S.R. 2001 No. 56)
 Registered Rents (Increase) Order (Northern Ireland) 2001 (S.R. 2001 No. 57)
 Local Government Pension Scheme (Pension Sharing on Divorce) Regulations (Northern Ireland) 2001 (S.R. 2001 No. 61)
 Local Government Pension Scheme (Management and Investment of Funds) (Amendment) Regulations (Northern Ireland) 2001 (S.R. 2001 No. 62)
 Local Government Pension Scheme (Amendment) Regulations (Northern Ireland) 2001 (S.R. 2001 No. 63)
 Local Government Pension Scheme (Amendment No. 2) Regulations (Northern Ireland) 2001 (S.R. 2001 No. 64)
 Magistrates' Courts (Terrorism Act 2000) Rules (Northern Ireland) 2001 (S.R. 2001 No. 65)
 Welfare of Animals (Slaughter or Killing) (Amendment) Regulations (Northern Ireland) 2001 (S.R. 2001 No. 66)
 County Courts (Financial Limits) Order (Northern Ireland) 2001 (S.R. 2001 No. 67)
 Superannuation (Chief Executive to the Mental Health Commission) Order (Northern Ireland) 2001 (S.R. 2001 No. 69)
 Less Favoured Area Compensatory Allowances Regulations (Northern Ireland) 2001 (S.R. 2001 No. 71)
 Private Streets (Amendment) (1992 Order) (Commencement) Order (Northern Ireland) 2001 (S.R. 2001 No. 72)
 Private Streets (Construction) (Amendment) Regulations (Northern Ireland) 2001 (S.R. 2001 No. 73)
 Nurses, Midwives and Health Visitors (Professional Conduct) (Amendment) Rules 2001, Approval Order (Northern Ireland) 2001 (S.R. 2001 No. 76)
 Education (Student Support) (Amendment No. 3) Regulations (Northern Ireland) 2001 (S.R. 2001 No. 77)
 Social Security (Miscellaneous Amendments) Regulations (Northern Ireland) 2001 (S.R. 2001 No. 78)
 Housing Benefit (General) (Amendment) Regulations (Northern Ireland) 2001 (S.R. 2001 No. 79)
 Royal Ulster Constabulary Reserve (Full-time) (Appointment and Conditions of Service) (Amendment) Regulations 2001 (S.R. 2001 No. 80)
 Foot-and-Mouth Disease (Amendment) Order (Northern Ireland) 2001 (S.R. 2001 No. 82)
 Foot-and-Mouth Disease (Infected Area) Order (Northern Ireland) 2001 (S.R. 2001 No. 83)
 Rates (Regional Rates) (No. 2) Order (Northern Ireland) 2001 (S.R. 2001 No. 84)
 Food Safety (General Food Hygiene) (Amendment) Regulations (Northern Ireland) 2001 (S.R. 2001 No. 85)
 Social Security (Reciprocal Agreements) Order (Northern Ireland) 2001 (S.R. 2001 No. 86)
 Foot-and-Mouth Disease (Controlled Area) Order (Northern Ireland) 2001 (S.R. 2001 No. 87)
 Social Security (Credits and Incapacity Benefit) (Amendment) Regulations (Northern Ireland) 2001 (S.R. 2001 No. 88)
 General Dental Services (Amendment No. 2) Regulations (Northern Ireland) 2001 (S.R. 2001 No. 89)
 Pig Industry Restructuring (Capital Grant) Scheme (Northern Ireland) 2001 (S.R. 2001 No. 90)
 Pig Industry Restructuring (Non-Capital Grant) Scheme Order (Northern Ireland) 2001 (S.R. 2001 No. 91)
 Foot-and-Mouth Disease (Controlled Area) (No. 2) Order (Northern Ireland) 2001 (S.R. 2001 No. 93)
 Pensions Increase (Review) Order (Northern Ireland) 2001 (S.R. 2001 No. 94)
 Housing Benefit (Extended Payments) Regulations (Northern Ireland) 2001 (S.R. 2001 No. 99)
 Social Security Revaluation of Earnings Factors Order (Northern Ireland) 2001 (S.R. 2001 No. 100)

101-200

 Historic Monuments (Class Consents) Order (Northern Ireland) 2001 (S.R. 2001 No. 101)
 Social Security (Crediting and Treatment of Contributions, and National Insurance Numbers) Regulations (Northern Ireland) 2001 (S.R. 2001 No. 102)
 Community Drivers' Hours (Foot-and-Mouth Disease) (Temporary Exception) Regulations (Northern Ireland) 2001 (S.R. 2001 No. 103)
 Travelling Expenses and Remission of Charges (Amendment) Regulations (Northern Ireland) 2001 (S.R. 2001 No. 104)
 Income Support (General) (Amendment) Regulations (Northern Ireland) 2001 (S.R. 2001 No. 105)
 Social Security Benefits Up-rating Regulations (Northern Ireland) 2001 (S.R. 2001 No. 106)
 Social Security (Industrial Injuries) (Dependency) (Permitted Earnings Limits) Order (Northern Ireland) 2001 (S.R. 2001 No. 107)
 Social Security (Benefits for Widows and Widowers) (Consequential Amendments) Regulations (Northern Ireland) 2001 (S.R. 2001 No. 108)
 Pensions Appeal Tribunals (Northern Ireland) (Amendment) Rules 2001 (S.R. 2001 No. 109)
 New Deal (Miscellaneous Provisions) Order (Northern Ireland) 2001 (S.R. 2001 No. 110)
 Legal Aid (Financial Conditions) Regulations (Northern Ireland) 2001 (S.R. 2001 No. 111)
 Legal Advice and Assistance (Financial Conditions) Regulations (Northern Ireland) 2001 (S.R. 2001 No. 112)
 Legal Advice and Assistance (Amendment No. 2) Regulations (Northern Ireland) 2001 (S.R. 2001 No. 113)
 Welfare Reform and Pensions (1999 Order) (Commencement No. 7 and Transitional Provisions) Order (Northern Ireland) 2001 (S.R. 2001 No. 114)
 Social Security (Hospital In-Patients) (Amendment) Regulations (Northern Ireland) 2001 (S.R. 2001 No. 115)
 Workmen's Compensation (Supplementation) (Amendment) Regulations (Northern Ireland) 2001 (S.R. 2001 No. 116)
 Social Security (Invalid Care Allowance) (Amendment) Regulations (Northern Ireland) 2001 (S.R. 2001 No. 117)
 Occupational and Personal Pension Schemes (Perpetuities and Contracting-out) (Amendment) Regulations (Northern Ireland) 2001 (S.R. 2001 No. 118)
 Stakeholder Pension Schemes (Amendment No. 2) Regulations (Northern Ireland) 2001 (S.R. 2001 No. 119)
 Social Security (Joint Claims Amendments) Regulations (Northern Ireland) 2001 (S.R. 2001 No. 120)
 Charges for Drugs and Appliances (Amendment) Regulations (Northern Ireland) 2001 (S.R. 2001 No. 123)
 Dental Charges (Amendment) Regulations (Northern Ireland) 2001 (S.R. 2001 No. 124)
 Road Traffic (Health Services Charges) Regulations (Northern Ireland) 2001 (S.R. 2001 No. 125)
 Extensification Payment Regulations (Northern Ireland) 2001 (S.R. 2001 No. 127)
 Health and Personal Social Services (2001 Act) (Commencement No. 1) Order (Northern Ireland) 2001 (S.R. 2001 No. 128)
 Milk and Milk Products (Pupils in Educational Establishments) Regulations (Northern Ireland) 2001 (S.R. 2001 No. 129)
 Police (Northern Ireland) Act 2000 (Commencement No. 2) Order 2001 (S.R. 2001 No. 132)
 Optical Charges and Payments (Amendment) Regulations (Northern Ireland) 2001 (S.R. 2001 No. 133)
 Social Security (Miscellaneous Amendments No. 2) Regulations (Northern Ireland) 2001 (S.R. 2001 No. 134)
 General Medical Services (Amendment) Regulations (Northern Ireland) 2001 (S.R. 2001 No. 135)
 Welfare Reform and Pensions (1999 Order) (Commencement No. 8) Order (Northern Ireland) 2001 (S.R. 2001 No. 137)
 Occupational Pension Schemes (Pensions Compensation Provisions) (Amendment) Regulations (Northern Ireland) 2001 (S.R. 2001 No. 138)
 Welfare Foods (Amendment) Regulations (Northern Ireland) 2001 (S.R. 2001 No. 139)
 Police (Recruitment) (Northern Ireland) Regulations 2001 (S.R. 2001 No. 140)
 Child Support, Pensions and Social Security (2000 Act) (Commencement No. 5) Order (Northern Ireland) 2001 (S.R. 2001 No. 141)
 Construction (Design and Management) (Amendment) Regulations (Northern Ireland) 2001 (S.R. 2001 No. 142)
 Lobster (Conservation of Stocks) (Revocation) Regulations (Northern Ireland) 2001 (S.R. 2001 No. 144)
 Assistance of Fish Farming Scheme (Revocation) Order (Northern Ireland) 2001 (S.R. 2001 No. 145)
 Motor Cycles (Eye Protectors) (Amendment) Regulations (Northern Ireland) 2001 (S.R. 2001 No. 146)
 Motor Cycles (Protective Headgear) (Amendment) Regulations (Northern Ireland) 2001 (S.R. 2001 No. 147)
 Social Security (Widow's Benefit and Retirement Pensions) (Amendment) Regulations (Northern Ireland) 2001 (S.R. 2001 No. 148)
 Teachers' Superannuation (Sharing of Pensions on Divorce or Annulment) Regulations (Northern Ireland) 2001 (S.R. 2001 No. 149)
 Social Security (Capital Disregards and Recovery of Benefits Amendment) Regulations (Northern Ireland) 2001 (S.R. 2001 No. 150)
 Social Security (New Deal Amendment) Regulations (Northern Ireland) 2001 (S.R. 2001 No. 151)
 Social Security (Work-focused Interviews for Lone Parents) Regulations (Northern Ireland) 2001 (S.R. 2001 No. 152)
 Companies (1986 Order) (Audit Exemption) (Amendment) Regulations (Northern Ireland) 2001 (S.R. 2001 No. 153)
 Community Drivers' Hours (Foot-and-Mouth Disease) (Temporary Exception) (No. 2) Regulations (Northern Ireland) 2001 (S.R. 2001 No. 154)
 Fresh Meat (Beef Controls) (Amendment) Regulations (Northern Ireland) 2001 (S.R. 2001 No. 155)
 Social Security (Incapacity Benefit) (Amendment) Regulations (Northern Ireland) 2001 (S.R. 2001 No. 156)
 Social Security (Capital Disregards Amendment No. 2) Regulations (Northern Ireland) 2001 (S.R. 2001 No. 157)
 Foyle Area and Carlingford Area (Angling) Regulations 2001 (S.R. 2001 No. 158)
 Foyle Area and Carlingford Area (Tagging and Logbook) Regulations 2001 (S.R. 2001 No. 159)
 Foyle Area and Carlingford Area (Close Seasons for Angling) Regulations 2001 (S.R. 2001 No. 160)
 Education (Student Loans) (Repayment) (Amendment) Regulations (Northern Ireland) 2001 (S.R. 2001 No. 162)
 Disability Discrimination Act 1995 (Commencement No. 7) Order (Northern Ireland) 2001 (S.R. 2001 No. 163)
 Street Trading (2001 Act) (Commencement) Order (Northern Ireland) 2001 (S.R. 2001 No. 164)
 Street Trading (Fixed Penalty) (Notice and Procedure) Regulations (Northern Ireland) 2001 (S.R. 2001 No. 165)
 Street Trading (Form of Licence) Regulations (Northern Ireland) 2001 (S.R. 2001 No. 166)
 General Medical Services (Amendment No. 2) Regulations (Northern Ireland) 2001 (S.R. 2001 No. 167)
 Chemicals (Hazard Information and Packaging for Supply) (Amendment) Regulations (Northern Ireland) 2001 (S.R. 2001 No. 168)
 Disability Discrimination (Taxis) (Carrying of Guide Dogs etc.) Regulations (Northern Ireland) 2001 (S.R. 2001 No. 169)
 Motor Vehicles (Approval) (Fees) Regulations (Northern Ireland) 2001 (S.R. 2001 No. 170)
 Road Vehicles Lighting (Amendment) Regulations (Northern Ireland) 2001 (S.R. 2001 No. 171)
 Motor Vehicles (Approval) Regulations (Northern Ireland) 2001 (S.R. 2001 No. 172)
 Motor Vehicles (Construction and Use) (Amendment No. 2) Regulations (Northern Ireland) 2001 (S.R. 2001 No. 173)
 Motor Vehicles (Type Approval) (Amendment) Regulations (Northern Ireland) 2001 (S.R. 2001 No. 174)
 Social Security (Claims and Information) Regulations (Northern Ireland) 2001 (S.R. 2001 No. 175)
 Social Security (Work-focused Interviews) Regulations (Northern Ireland) 2001 (S.R. 2001 No. 176)
 General Grant (Specified Bodies) Regulations (Northern Ireland) 2001 (S.R. 2001 No. 178)
 Housing Benefit (General) (Amendment No. 2) Regulations (Northern Ireland) 2001 (S.R. 2001 No. 179)
 Import and Export Restrictions (Foot-and-Mouth Disease) Regulations (Northern Ireland) 2001 (S.R. 2001 No. 183)
 RUC (Complaints etc.) Regulations 2001 (S.R. 2001 No. 184)
 Resident Magistrate, Justice of the Peace and Clerk of Petty Sessions (Costs) Regulations (Northern Ireland) 2001 (S.R. 2001 No. 185)
 Restriction on Pithing Regulations (Northern Ireland) 2001 (S.R. 2001 No. 186)
 Seed Potatoes Regulations (Northern Ireland) 2001 (S.R. 2001 No. 188)
 Specified Risk Material (Amendment) (No. 2) Regulations (Northern Ireland) 2001 (S.R. 2001 No. 196)
 Child Support (Miscellaneous Amendments) Regulations (Northern Ireland) 2001 (S.R. 2001 No. 197)
 Motor Hackney Carriages (Belfast) (Amendment) By-Laws (Northern Ireland) 2001 (S.R. 2001 No. 198)
 Slaughter Premium Regulations (Northern Ireland) 2001 (S.R. 2001 No. 199)

201-300

 Non-automatic Weighing Instruments (Use for Trade) Regulations (Northern Ireland) 2001 (S.R. 2001 No. 202)
 Import and Export Restrictions (Foot-and-Mouth Disease) (No. 2) Regulations (Northern Ireland) 2001 (S.R. 2001 No. 204)
 Health and Personal Social Services (Assessment of Resources) (Amendment) Regulations (Northern Ireland) 2001 (S.R. 2001 No. 205)
 Code of Practice (Access to Workers during Recognition and Derecognition Ballots) (Appointed Day) Order (Northern Ireland) 2001 (S.R. 2001 No. 208)
 Feeding Stuffs (Sampling and Analysis) (Amendment) Regulations (Northern Ireland) 2001 (S.R. 2001 No. 209)
 Bovines and Bovine Products (Trade) (Amendment) Regulations (Northern Ireland) 2001 (S.R. 2001 No. 210)
 Smoke Control Areas (Exempted Fireplaces) (Amendment) Regulations (Northern Ireland) 2001 (S.R. 2001 No. 211)
 Foot-and-Mouth Disease (Controlled Area) (No. 3) Order (Northern Ireland) 2001 (S.R. 2001 No. 212)
 Housing Benefit (Decisions and Appeals) Regulations (Northern Ireland) 2001 (S.R. 2001 No. 213)
 Housing Benefit (Decisions and Appeals) (Transitional and Savings) Regulations (Northern Ireland) 2001 (S.R. 2001 No. 214)
 Housing Benefit (Decisions and Appeals and Discretionary Financial Assistance) (Consequential Amendments and Revocations) Regulations (Northern Ireland) 2001 (S.R. 2001 No. 215)
 Discretionary Financial Assistance Regulations (Northern Ireland) 2001 (S.R. 2001 No. 216)
 Medical Act 1983 (Approved Medical Practices and Conditions of Residence) and General Medical Services (Amendment No. 3) Regulations (Northern Ireland) 2001 (S.R. 2001 No. 217)
 General Medical Services (Miscellaneous Amendments) Regulations (Northern Ireland) 2001 (S.R. 2001 No. 218)
 Income Support (General) (Standard Interest Rate Amendment) Regulations (Northern Ireland) 2001 (S.R. 2001 No. 219)
 Pharmaceutical Services (Amendment) Regulations (Northern Ireland) 2001 (S.R. 2001 No. 222)
 Community Drivers' Hours (Foot-and-Mouth Disease) (Temporary Exception) (No. 2) (Amendment) Regulations (Northern Ireland) 2001 (S.R. 2001 No. 223)
 Planning (Fees) (Amendment) Regulations (Northern Ireland) 2001 (S.R. 2001 No. 225)
 Gelatine (Intra-Community Trade) Regulations (Northern Ireland) 2001 (S.R. 2001 No. 226)
 Income Support and Jobseeker's Allowance (Amounts for Persons in Residential Care and Nursing Homes) Regulations (Northern Ireland) 2001 (S.R. 2001 No. 227)
 Seed Potatoes (Crop Fees) Regulations (Northern Ireland) 2001 (S.R. 2001 No. 228)
 Departments (Transfer of Functions) Order (Northern Ireland) 2001 (S.R. 2001 No. 229)
 Education (Pupil Records) (Amendment) Regulations (Northern Ireland) 2001 (S.R. 2001 No. 236)
 Compulsory Registration of Title Order (Northern Ireland) 2001 (S.R. 2001 No. 237)
 Housing Benefit (General) (Amendment No. 3) Regulations (Northern Ireland) 2001 (S.R. 2001 No. 238)
 Import and Export Restrictions (Foot-and-Mouth Disease) (No. 2) (Revocation) Regulations (Northern Ireland) 2001 (S.R. 2001 No. 239)
 Motor Vehicles (Driving Licences) (Fees) (Amendment) Regulations (Northern Ireland) 2001 (S.R. 2001 No. 240)
 Motor Vehicles (Construction and Use) (Amendment No. 3) Regulations (Northern Ireland) 2001 (S.R. 2001 No. 241)
 Products of Animal Origin (Import and Export) (Amendment) Regulations (Northern Ireland) 2001 (S.R. 2001 No. 242)
 Public Service Vehicles (Licence Fees) (Amendment) Regulations (Northern Ireland) 2001 (S.R. 2001 No. 244)
 Motor Vehicles (Driving Licences) (Amendment) (Test Fees) Regulations (Northern Ireland) 2001 (S.R. 2001 No. 245)
 Motor Vehicle Testing (Amendment) (Fees) Regulations (Northern Ireland) 2001 (S.R. 2001 No. 246)
 Goods Vehicles (Testing) (Fees) (Amendment) Regulations (Northern Ireland) 2001 (S.R. 2001 No. 247)
 Rehabilitation of Offenders (Exceptions) (Amendment) Order (Northern Ireland) 2001 (S.R. 2001 No. 248)
 Child Support, Pensions and Social Security (2000 Act) (Commencement No. 6) Order (Northern Ireland) 2001 (S.R. 2001 No. 249)
 Criminal Appeal (Amendment) (Northern Ireland) Rules 2001 (S.R. 2001 No. 250)
 Legal Aid in Criminal Proceedings (Costs) (Amendment) Rules (Northern Ireland) 2001 (S.R. 2001 No. 251)
 Crown Court (Amendment) Rules (Northern Ireland) 2001 (S.R. 2001 No. 253)
 Rules of the Supreme Court (Northern Ireland) (Amendment) 2001 (S.R. 2001 No. 254)
 Social Security (Volunteers Amendment) Regulations (Northern Ireland) 2001 (S.R. 2001 No. 258)
 Housing Benefit (General) (Amendment No. 4) Regulations (Northern Ireland) 2001 (S.R. 2001 No. 259)
 Social Security (1998 Order) (Commencement No. 12) Order (Northern Ireland) 2001 (S.R. 2001 No. 260)
 Social Security (Discretionary Housing Payments Amendment) Regulations (Northern Ireland) 2001 (S.R. 2001 No. 261)
 Royal Ulster Constabulary Pensions (Amendment) Regulations 2001 (S.R. 2001 No. 263)
 Rail Vehicle Accessibility Regulations (Northern Ireland) 2001 (S.R. 2001 No. 264)
 Rail Vehicle (Exemption Applications) Regulations (Northern Ireland) 2001 (S.R. 2001 No. 265)
 Motor Vehicles (Driving Licences) (Amendment) Regulations (Northern Ireland) 2001 (S.R. 2001 No. 267)
 Community Drivers' Hours (Foot-and-Mouth Disease) (Temporary Exception) (No. 2) (Amendment No. 2) Regulations (Northern Ireland) 2001 (S.R. 2001 No. 268)
 Environmentally Sensitive Areas Designation Order (Northern Ireland) 2001 (S.R. 2001 No. 269)
 Environmentally Sensitive Areas (Enforcement) Regulations (Northern Ireland) 2001 (S.R. 2001 No. 270)
 Beef Labelling (Enforcement) Regulations (Northern Ireland) 2001 (S.R. 2001 No. 271)
 Education (Student Loans) (Amendment) Regulations (Northern Ireland) 2001 (S.R. 2001 No. 276)
 Education (Student Support) Regulations (Northern Ireland) 2001 (S.R. 2001 No. 277)
 Social Security (Students and Income-Related Benefits Amendment) Regulations (Northern Ireland) 2001 (S.R. 2001 No. 278)
 Local Government (Discretionary Payments) Regulations (Northern Ireland) 2001 (S.R. 2001 No. 279)
 Plant Protection Products (Amendment) Regulations (Northern Ireland) 2001 (S.R. 2001 No. 280)
 Industrial Training Levy (Construction Industry) Order (Northern Ireland) 2001 (S.R. 2001 No. 281)
 Sex Discrimination (Indirect Discrimination and Burden of Proof) Regulations (Northern Ireland) 2001 (S.R. 2001 No. 282)
 Water (1999 Order) (Commencement and Transitional Provisions) Order (Northern Ireland) 2001 (S.R. 2001 No. 283)
 Control of Pollution (Applications and Registers) Regulations (Northern Ireland) 2001 (S.R. 2001 No. 284)
 Education (Grants for Disabled Postgraduate Students) Regulations (Northern Ireland) 2001 (S.R. 2001 No. 285)
 Catering Waste (Feeding to Livestock) Order (Northern Ireland) 2001 (S.R. 2001 No. 286)
 Welfare Reform and Pensions (Persons Abroad: Benefits for Widows and Widowers) (Consequential Amendments) Regulations (Northern Ireland) 2001 (S.R. 2001 No. 287)
 General Teaching Council for Northern Ireland (Constitution) Regulations (Northern Ireland) 2001 (S.R. 2001 No. 288)
 Income Support (General) (Standard Interest Rate Amendment No. 2) Regulations (Northern Ireland) 2001 (S.R. 2001 No. 289)
 Legal Advice and Assistance (Amendment No. 3) Regulations (Northern Ireland) 2001 (S.R. 2001 No. 290)
 Fisheries (Tagging and Logbook) Byelaws (Northern Ireland) 2001 (S.R. 2001 No. 291)
 Bovine Spongiform Encephalopathy Monitoring Regulations (Northern Ireland) 2001 (S.R. 2001 No. 292)
 Lands Tribunal (Salaries) Order (Northern Ireland) 2001 (S.R. 2001 No. 293)
 Community Drivers' Hours (Foot-and-Mouth Disease) (Temporary Exception) (No. 2) (Amendment No. 3) Regulations (Northern Ireland) 2001 (S.R. 2001 No. 294)
 Genetically Modified Organisms (Contained Use) Regulations (Northern Ireland) 2001 (S.R. 2001 No. 295)
 Food Protection (Emergency Prohibitions) Order (Northern Ireland) 2001 (S.R. 2001 No. 296)
 Students Awards Regulations (Northern Ireland) 2001 (S.R. 2001 No. 298)
 Road Traffic (Health Services Charges) (Appeals) Regulations (Northern Ireland) 2001 (S.R. 2001 No. 299)

301-400

 Salaries (Assembly Ombudsman and Commissioner for Complaints) Order (Northern Ireland) 2001 (S.R. 2001 No. 302)
 Foot-and-Mouth Disease (Controlled Area) (No. 4) Order (Northern Ireland) 2001 (S.R. 2001 No. 303)
 Social Security (Medical Evidence) and Statutory Maternity Pay (Medical Evidence) (Amendment) Regulations (Northern Ireland) 2001 (S.R. 2001 No. 308)
 General Dental Services (Amendment No. 3) Regulations (Northern Ireland) 2001 (S.R. 2001 No. 309)
 Motor Vehicles (Driving Licences) (Amendment No. 2) (Test Fees) Regulations (Northern Ireland) 2001 (S.R. 2001 No. 310)
 Community Drivers' Hours (Foot-and-Mouth Disease) (Temporary Exception) (No. 2) (Amendment No. 4) Regulations (Northern Ireland) 2001 (S.R. 2001 No. 311)
 Animals and Animal Products (Import and Export) (Amendment) Regulations (Northern Ireland) 2001 (S.R. 2001 No. 312)
 Northern Ireland Social Care Council (Appointments and Procedure) Regulations (Northern Ireland) 2001 (S.R. 2001 No. 313)
 Social Security (Personal Allowances for Children and Young Persons Amendment) Regulations (Northern Ireland) 2001 (S.R. 2001 No. 314)
 Housing Renovation etc. Grants (Reduction of Grant) (Amendment) Regulations (Northern Ireland) 2001 (S.R. 2001 No. 315)
 Social Security (Incapacity Benefit) (Miscellaneous Amendments) Regulations (Northern Ireland) 2001 (S.R. 2001 No. 316)
 Life Sentence Review Commissioners' Rules 2001 (S.R. 2001 No. 317)
 Social Fund (Maternity and Funeral Expenses) (General) (Amendment) Regulations (Northern Ireland) 2001 (S.R. 2001 No. 318)
 Part-Time Workers (Prevention of Less Favourable Treatment) Regulations (Northern Ireland) 2001 (S.R. 2001 No. 319)
 Adoption (Intercountry Aspects) Act (Northern Ireland) 2001 (Commencement No. 1 Order (Northern Ireland) 2001 (S.R. 2001 No. 322)
 Health and Personal Social Services (2001 Act) (Commencement No. 2) Order (Northern Ireland) 2001 (S.R. 2001 No. 324)
 Vegetable Seeds (Amendment) Regulations (Northern Ireland) 2001 (S.R. 2001 No. 327)
 Oil and Fibre Plant Seeds (Amendment) Regulations (Northern Ireland) 2001 (S.R. 2001 No. 328)
 Fodder Plant Seeds (Amendment) Regulations (Northern Ireland) 2001 (S.R. 2001 No. 329)
 Cereal Seeds (Amendment) Regulations (Northern Ireland) 2001 (S.R. 2001 No. 330)
 Beet Seeds (Amendment) Regulations (Northern Ireland) 2001 (S.R. 2001 No. 331)
 Rural Development (Financial Assistance) Regulations (Northern Ireland) 2001 (S.R. 2001 No. 332)
 Foot-and-Mouth Disease (Controlled Area) (No. 5) Order (Northern Ireland) 2001 (S.R. 2001 No. 336)
 Life Sentences (Northern Ireland) Order 2001 (Commencement) Order 2001 (S.R. 2001 No. 337)
 Street Works (Sharing of Costs of Works) (Amendment) Regulations (Northern Ireland) 2001 (S.R. 2001 No. 338)
 General Ophthalmic Services (Amendment) Regulations (Northern Ireland) 2001 (S.R. 2001 No. 339)
 Community Drivers' Hours (Foot-and-Mouth Disease) (Temporary Exception) (No. 2) (Amendment No. 5) Regulations (Northern Ireland) 2001 (S.R. 2001 No. 340)
 Food Protection (Emergency Prohibitions No. 2) Order (Northern Ireland) 2001 (S.R. 2001 No. 341)
 Food Protection (Emergency Prohibitions) (Revocation) Order (Northern Ireland) 2001 (S.R. 2001 No. 342)
 Fire Precautions (Workplace) Regulations (Northern Ireland) 2001 (S.R. 2001 No. 348)
 Fishing Vessels (Decommissioning) Scheme (Northern Ireland) 2001 (S.R. 2001 No. 349)
 Suckler Cow Premium Regulations (Northern Ireland) 2001 (S.R. 2001 No. 362)
 Beef Special Premium Regulations (Northern Ireland) 2001 (S.R. 2001 No. 363)
 Motor Vehicle Testing (Amendment) Regulations (Northern Ireland) 2001 (S.R. 2001 No. 364)
 Goods Vehicles (Testing) (Amendment) Regulations (Northern Ireland) 2001 (S.R. 2001 No. 365)
 Public Service Vehicles (Amendment) Regulations (Northern Ireland) 2001 (S.R. 2001 No. 366)
 Health and Personal Social Services (Injury Benefits) Regulations (Northern Ireland) 2001 (S.R. 2001 No. 367)
 Food Protection (Emergency Prohibitions No. 3) Order (Northern Ireland) 2001 (S.R. 2001 No. 368)
 Police Trainee Regulations (Northern Ireland) 2001 (S.R. 2001 No. 369)
 Optical Charges and Payments and General Ophthalmic Services (Amendment) Regulations (Northern Ireland) 2001 (S.R. 2001 No. 370)
 Road Vehicles Lighting (Amendment No. 2) Regulations (Northern Ireland) 2001 (S.R. 2001 No. 372)
 Social Fund Winter Fuel Payment (Amendment) Regulations (Northern Ireland) 2001 (S.R. 2001 No. 373)
 General Medical Services (Amendment No. 4) Regulations (Northern Ireland) 2001 (S.R. 2001 No. 374)
 Road Traffic Offenders (Additional Offences and Prescribed Devices) Order (Northern Ireland) 2001 (S.R. 2001 No. 375)
 Specified Risk Material (Amendment No. 3) Regulations (Northern Ireland) 2001 (S.R. 2001 No. 376)
 Specified Risk Material (Amendment) (No. 2) Order (Northern Ireland) 2001 (S.R. 2001 No. 377)
 Rendering (Fluid Treatment) Order (Northern Ireland) 2001 (S.R. 2001 No. 378)
 Strangford Lough (Prohibition of Fishing for Shellfish) Regulations (Northern Ireland) 2001 (S.R. 2001 No. 379)
 Social Fund (Cold Weather Payments) (General) (Amendment) Regulations (Northern Ireland) 2001 (S.R. 2001 No. 386)
 Carriage of Explosives by Rail Regulations (Northern Ireland) 2001 (S.R. 2001 No. 387)
 Street Works (1995 Order) (Commencement No. 5) Order (Northern Ireland) 2001 (S.R. 2001 No. 388)
 Food Protection (Emergency Prohibitions No. 4) Order (Northern Ireland) 2001 (S.R. 2001 No. 389)
 Carriage of Explosives (Amendment) Regulations (Northern Ireland) 2001 (S.R. 2001 No. 390)
 Farm Subsidies (Review of Decisions) Regulations (Northern Ireland) 2001 (S.R. 2001 No. 391)
 Social Security (Capital Disregards Amendment No. 3) Regulations (Northern Ireland) 2001 (S.R. 2001 No. 392)
 Dogs (Licensing and Identification) (Amendment) Regulations (Northern Ireland) 2001 (S.R. 2001 No. 393)
 Drainage (Environmental Impact Assessment) Regulations (Northern Ireland) 2001 (S.R. 2001 No. 394)
 Local Government (General Grant) Order (Northern Ireland) 2001 (S.R. 2001 No. 395)
 Police (Northern Ireland) Act 2000 (Commencement No. 3 and Transitional Provisions) Order 2001 (S.R. 2001 No. 396)
 Foyle Area and Carlingford Area (Licensing of Fishing Engines) Regulations 2001 (S.R. 2001 No. 397)
 Community Drivers' Hours (Foot-and-Mouth Disease) (Temporary Exception) (No. 2) (Amendment No. 6) Regulations (Northern Ireland) 2001 (S.R. 2001 No. 398)
 Food Protection (Emergency Prohibitions No. 2) (Revocation) Order (Northern Ireland) 2001 (S.R. 2001 No. 399)
 Rehabilitation of Offenders (Exceptions) (Amendment) (No. 2) Order (Northern Ireland) 2001 (S.R. 2001 No. 400)

401-500

 Plant Health (Wood and Bark) (Amendment) Order (Northern Ireland) 2001 (S.R. 2001 No. 401)
 Motor Vehicles (Driving Licences) (Amendment No. 2) Regulations (Northern Ireland) 2001 (S.R. 2001 No. 402)
 Processed Animal Protein Regulations (Northern Ireland) 2001 (S.R. 2001 No. 405)
 Income Support (General) and Jobseeker's Allowance (Amendment) Regulations (Northern Ireland) 2001 (S.R. 2001 No. 406)
 Food Protection (Emergency Prohibitions) (Revocation No. 2) Order (Northern Ireland) 2001 (S.R. 2001 No. 407)
 Colours in Food (Amendment) Regulations (Northern Ireland) 2001 (S.R. 2001 No. 408)
 Street Works (Inspection Fees) Regulations (Northern Ireland) 2001 (S.R. 2001 No. 409)
 Income Support (General) (Standard Interest Rate Amendment No. 3) Regulations (Northern Ireland) 2001 (S.R. 2001 No. 410)
 Sheep Annual Premium (Amendment) Regulations (Northern Ireland) 2001 (S.R. 2001 No. 411)
 Occupational Pensions (Revaluation) Order (Northern Ireland) 2001 (S.R. 2001 No. 412)
 Street Works (Maintenance) Regulations (Northern Ireland) 2001 (S.R. 2001 No. 413)
 Gaming (Variation of Monetary Limits) Order (Northern Ireland) 2001 (S.R. 2001 No. 414)
 Gaming (Bingo) (Amendment) Regulations (Northern Ireland) 2001 (S.R. 2001 No. 415)
 Social Security Fraud (2001 Act) (Commencement No. 1) Order (Northern Ireland) 2001 (S.R. 2001 No. 416)
 Miscellaneous Food Additives (Amendment No. 2) Regulations (Northern Ireland) 2001 (S.R. 2001 No. 419)
 Social Security (Notification of Change of Circumstances) Regulations (Northern Ireland) 2001 (S.R. 2001 No. 420)
 Fair Employment (Specification of Public Authorities) (Amendment) Order (Northern Ireland) 2001 (S.R. 2001 No. 421)
 Biocidal Products Regulations (Northern Ireland) 2001 (S.R. 2001 No. 422)
 New Deal (Lone Parents) (Miscellaneous Provisions) Order (Northern Ireland) 2001 (S.R. 2001 No. 423)
 Foot-and-Mouth Disease (Controlled Area) (No. 6) Order (Northern Ireland) 2001 (S.R. 2001 No. 424)
 Legal Aid in Criminal Proceedings (Costs) (Amendment No. 2) Rules (Northern Ireland) 2001 (S.R. 2001 No. 426)
 Feeding Stuffs (Amendment) Regulations (Northern Ireland) 2001 (S.R. 2001 No. 428)
 Poultry Meat, Farmed Game Bird Meat and Rabbit Meat (Hygiene and Inspection) (Amendment) Regulations (Northern Ireland) 2001 (S.R. 2001 No. 429)
 Misuse of Drugs (Designation) Order (Northern Ireland) 2001 (S.R. 2001 No. 431)
 Magistrates' Courts (Amendment) Rules (Northern Ireland) 2001 (S.R. 2001 No. 432)
 Fisheries (Amendment) Byelaws (Northern Ireland) 2001 (S.R. 2001 No. 433)
 Road Traffic (Health Services Charges) (Amendment) Regulations (Northern Ireland) 2001 (S.R. 2001 No. 434)
 Environmental Impact Assessment (Uncultivated Land and Semi-Natural Areas) Regulations (Northern Ireland) 2001 (S.R. 2001 No. 435)
 Radiation (Emergency Preparedness and Public Information) Regulations (Northern Ireland) 2001 (S.R. 2001 No. 436)
 Plant Health (Amendment) Order (Northern Ireland) 2001 (S.R. 2001 No. 437)
 Welfare Reform and Pensions (1999 Order) (Commencement No. 9) Order (Northern Ireland) 2001 (S.R. 2001 No. 438)
 Disability Discrimination Act 1995 (Commencement No. 8) Order (Northern Ireland) 2001 (S.R. 2001 No. 439)
 Additional Pension and Social Security Pensions (Home Responsibilities) (Amendment) Regulations (Northern Ireland) 2001 (S.R. 2001 No. 440)
 Social Security (Inherited SERPS) Regulations (Northern Ireland) 2001 (S.R. 2001 No. 441)

External links
  Statutory Rules (NI) List
 Draft Statutory Rules (NI) List

2001
Statutory rules
Northern Ireland Statutory Rules